Inha Babakova (née Butkus, born 26 June 1967) is a former high jumper who represented the Soviet Union and later Ukraine. She was born in Asgabat, Turkmen SSR. Her personal best is 2.05 metres.

Babakova won an Olympic bronze medal in Atlanta 1996 and became World Champion in Seville 1999. She also won four other World Championship medals, with bronzes in 1991 and 1995 and silvers in 1997 and 2001. Track and Field News magazine ranked her in the world's top ten in their annual merit rankings for 13 out of 14 seasons (1991-2004), the exception being 1998. She was in the top five ten times. Only Stefka Kostadinova, among other female high jumpers, has more top ten rankings.  Her 2.01 m clearance in Oslo on her 36th birthday in 2003 is the women's W35 World Record.

Achievements

Note: Results with a q, indicate overall position in qualifying round.

See also
Female two metres club

References

External links
 
 
 
 Sporting Heroes

1967 births
Living people
Ukrainian female high jumpers
Soviet female high jumpers
Athletes (track and field) at the 1996 Summer Olympics
Athletes (track and field) at the 2000 Summer Olympics
Sportspeople from Ashgabat
Athletes (track and field) at the 2004 Summer Olympics
Olympic athletes of Ukraine
Olympic bronze medalists for Ukraine
World Athletics Championships medalists
Ukrainian people of Lithuanian descent
Turkmenistan people of Lithuanian descent
Medalists at the 1996 Summer Olympics
Olympic bronze medalists in athletics (track and field)
World Athletics Championships athletes for the Soviet Union
World Athletics Championships athletes for Ukraine
World Athletics Championships winners